Arothron stellatus, also known as the stellate puffer, starry puffer, starry pufferfish, or starry toadfish, is a demersal marine fish belonging to the family Tetraodontidae. It is found in shallow water in the Indo-Pacific region.

Description
Its body is oval shaped, spherical and relatively elongated. The skin is not covered with scales but is prickly. The fish has no pelvic fin and no lateral line. The dorsal fin and the anal fin are small, symmetric, and located at the rear end of the body. The head is large with a short snout that has two pairs of nostrils, and the mouth is terminal with four strong teeth.

The background coloration goes from white to grey, and the body is harmoniously dotted with black spots. The ventral area is usually clearer. The size of the spots is inversely proportional to the size of the fish; thus, a young individual will have large spots and adults of maximal size will have small spots. The juveniles have a yellowish body background coloration with dark stripes. The young adults still have stripes on the ventral area that will turn to spots later, and also some recollection of yellow on the body.

Distribution and habitat
This species is found in tropical and subtropical waters from the Indian Ocean and Red Sea as far as Polynesia, southern Japan, the western, northern and eastern coasts of Australia and Lord Howe Island.

Behavior
Arothron stellatus feeds on benthic invertebrates, sponges, algae, the polyps of corals such as Acropora, crustaceans and mollusks.

This pufferfish is diurnal. It is mainly solitary and defends a territory.

Potential danger

Arothron stellatus contains a highly toxic poison, tetrodotoxin, in its ovaries and to a lesser extent its skin and liver, which protects it from voracious predators. It becomes toxic as it eats bacteria that contain the toxin. To ward off potential enemies, they can inflate their bodies by swallowing air or water.

Taxonomic synonyms
The World Register of Marine Species lists the following synonyms: -
 Arothron aerostaticus (Jenyns, 1842)
Arothron alboreticulatus (Tanaka, 1908)
Arothron stellatus (Bloch & Schneider, 1801)
Chelonodon stellaris (Bloch & Schneider, 1801) (misspelling)
Diodon asper Cuvier, 1818
Kanduka michiei Hora, 1925
Takifugu stellatus (Bloch & Schneider, 1801)
Tetraodon aerostaticus Jenyns, 1842
Tetraodon aerostatious Jenyns, 1842 (misspelling)
Tetraodon alboreticulatus Tanaka, 1908
Tetraodon calamara Rüppell, 1829
Tetraodon lagocephalus var. stellatus Bloch & Schneider, 1801
Tetraodon punctatus Bloch & Schneider, 1801
Tetraodon stellatus Bloch & Schneider, 1801
Tetraodon stellatus Anonymous, 1798
Tetraodon stellatus Shaw, 1804
Tetrodon aerostaticus Jenyns, 1842 (misspelling)
Tetrodon lagocephalus stellatus Bloch & Schneider, 1801 (misspelling)
Tetrodon lagocephalus var. stellatus Bloch & Schneider, 1801 (misspelling)
Tetrodon punctatus Bloch & Schneider, 1801 (misspelling)
Tetrodon stellatus Bloch & Schneider, 1801 (misspelling)
Tetrodon stellatus Shaw, 1804 (misspelling)
Tetrodon stellatus Anonymous, 1798 (misspelling)

References

External links
 Fishes of Australia : Arothron stellatus
 

starry puffer
Marine fish of Northern Australia
starry puffer